Statherin is a protein in humans that is encoded by the STATH gene. It prevents the precipitation of calcium phosphate in saliva, maintaining a high calcium level in saliva available for remineralisation of tooth enamel and high phosphate levels for buffering.

References

Further reading